Silphinae is a subfamily of burying beetles or carrion beetles.  There are 113 extant species of this subfamily, in two tribe and in 14 genera. It contains the following tribes and genera:

Tribes and genera 
 Necrodini Portevin, 1926
 Diamesus Hope, 1840
 Necrodes Leach, 1815
 Silphini Latreille, 1806
 Ablattaria Reitter, 1884
 Aclypea Reitter, 1884
 Dendroxena Motschulsky, 1858
 Heterosilpha Portevin, 1926
 Heterotemna Wollaston, 1864
 Necrophila Kirby & Spence, 1828
 Oiceoptoma Leach, 1815
 Oxelytrum Gistel, 1848
 Phosphuga Leach, 1817
 Ptomaphila Kirby & Spence, 1828
 Silpha Linnaeus, 1758
 Thanatophilus Leach, 1815
 Allopliosilpha Gersdorf, 1969
 Pliosilpha Gersdorf, 1970

References

Silphidae
Taxa named by Pierre André Latreille